Iván Romero de Ávila Araque (born 10 April 2001), known as Iván Romero, is a Spanish footballer who plays as a forward for CD Tenerife, on loan from Sevilla FC.

Club career
Born in La Solana, Ciudad Real, Castilla–La Mancha, Romero joined Sevilla FC's youth setup in September 2017, from Albacete Balompié. He made his senior debut with the reserves on 14 December 2019, starting in a 0–0 Segunda División B away draw against Club Recreativo Granada.

Definitely promoted to the B-side for the 2020–21 campaign, Romero scored his first senior goals on 21 November 2020, netting a brace in a 2–1 away defeat of Córdoba CF. The following 8 April, he renewed his contract until 2024, and finished the season with 12 goals.

Romero made his first team – and La Liga – debut with the Andalusians on 15 August 2021, coming on as a late substitute for Fernando in a 3–0 home success over Rayo Vallecano.

On 31 August 2022, Romero was loaned to Segunda División side CD Tenerife for the season.

Career statistics

Club

References

External links

2001 births
Living people
People from Ciudad Real
Sportspeople from the Province of Ciudad Real
Spanish footballers
Footballers from Castilla–La Mancha
Association football forwards
La Liga players
Primera Federación players
Segunda División B players
Sevilla Atlético players
Sevilla FC players
CD Tenerife players